The term narcotic (from ancient Greek ναρκῶ narkō, "to make numb") originally referred medically to any psychoactive compound with numbing or paralyzing properties. In the United States, it has since become associated with opiates and opioids, commonly morphine and heroin, as well as derivatives of many of the compounds found within raw opium latex. The primary three are morphine, codeine, and thebaine (while thebaine itself is only very mildly psychoactive, it is a crucial precursor in the vast majority of semi-synthetic opioids, such as oxycodone or hydrocodone).

Legally speaking, the term "narcotic" may be imprecisely defined and typically has negative connotations. When used in a legal context in the U.S., a narcotic drug is totally prohibited, such as heroin, or one that is used in violation of legal regulation (in this word sense, equal to any controlled substance or illicit drug). 
	
In the medical community, the term is more precisely defined and generally does not carry the same negative connotations.

Statutory classification of a drug as a narcotic often increases the penalties for violation of drug control statutes. For example, although U.S. federal law classifies both cocaine and amphetamines as "Schedule II" drugs, the penalty for possession of cocaine is greater than the penalty for possession of amphetamines because cocaine, unlike amphetamines, is classified as a narcotic.

United Nations

Single Convention on Narcotic Drugs, 1961 
The adoption of this convention is regarded as a milestone in the history of the international drug ban. The Single Convention codified all existing multilateral treaties on drug control and extended the existing control systems to include the cultivation of plants that were grown as the raw material of narcotic drugs. The principal objectives of the convention are to limit the possession, use, trade, distribution, import, export, manufacture, and production of drugs exclusively for medical and scientific purposes, and to address drug trafficking through international cooperation to deter and discourage drug traffickers. The convention also established the International Narcotics Control Board, merging the Permanent Central Board and the Drug Supervisory Board.

The 1961 Convention seeks to control over 116 drugs that it classifies as narcotic. These include:
 plant-based products such as opium and its derivatives morphine, codeine, and heroin (the primary category of drug listed in the convention);
 synthetic narcotics such as methadone and pethidine; and
 cannabis, coca, and cocaine.
The Convention divides drugs into four groups, or schedules, to enforce a greater or lesser degree of control for the various substances and compounds. Opium smoking and eating, coca leaf chewing, cannabis resin smoking, and the non-medical use of cannabis are prohibited. The 1972 Protocol to this Convention calls for increased efforts to prevent illicit production of, traffic in, and use of narcotics as defined by the convention, while highlighting the need to provide treatment and rehabilitation services to drug abusers.

INCB  Yellow List 
This document contains the current list of narcotic drugs under international control and additional
information to assist governments in filling in the International Narcotics Control Board questionnaires
related to narcotic drugs, namely, form A, form B and form C.

In medicine, a chemical agent that induces stupor, coma, or insensibility to pain
(also called narcotic analgesic).

In the context of international drug control, "narcotic drug" means any drug
defined as such under the 1961 Convention.

World Health Organization

Studies on the definition of counterfeit medicines in WHO member states

4. Assessment of the definitions of counterfeit medicines (or equivalent) in the Member States

4.2 The nature of legal definitions: the unambiguity requirement

In order to avoid room for difference in interpretation, lawmakers (codificators) sometimes deviate from etymological (definiendum plus definientia) definitions. In doing so, they approach the term from the law enforcement point of view.
The best example is the definition of narcotics in the United Nations Conventions. Narcotics are substances and preparations that induce drowsiness, sleep, stupor, insensibility, etc., and that these effects (and their rate) are complicated to prove, e.g. during litigation. Thus, the legal definition of a narcotic is whether or not it is listed on the Schedules of the convention. If it is on some of the Schedules, it is narcotic.

Lexicon of alcohol and drug terms published by the World Health Organization

The term usually refers to opiates or opioids, which are called narcotic analgesics. In common parlance and legal usage, it is often used imprecisely to mean illicit drugs, irrespective of their pharmacology. For example, narcotics control legislation in Canada, the US, and certain other countries includes cocaine and cannabis as well as opioids (see also conventions, international drug). Because of this variation in usage, the term is best replaced by one with a more specific meaning (e.g. opioid).

United States

Section 1300.01 Definitions relating to controlled substances:

A 1984 amendment to 21 USC (Controlled Substances Act), Section 802
expanded and revised definition of "narcotic drug", including within term poppy straw, cocaine, and ecgonine.

US v. Stieren
608 F.2d 1135

History 
The term "narcotic" is believed to have been coined by the Greek physician Galen to refer to agents that numb or deaden, causing paralysis or loss of feeling. It is based on the Greek word ναρκωσις (narcosis), the term used by Hippocrates for the process of numbing or the numbed state. Galen listed mandrake root, altercus (eclata), seeds, and poppy juice (opium) as the chief examples. It originally referred to any substance that relieved pain, dulled the senses, or induced sleep. Now, the term is used in many ways. Some people might define narcotics as substances that bind at opioid receptors (cellular membrane proteins activated by substances like heroin or morphine), while others refer to any illicit substance as a narcotic. From a U.S. legal perspective, narcotics refer to opium, opium derivatives, and their semi-synthetic substitutes, though in U.S. law, due to its numbing properties, cocaine is also considered a narcotic.

The definition encompassing "any illegal drug" was first recorded in 1926. Its first use as an adjective is first attested to c. 1600. There are many different types of narcotics. The two most common forms of narcotic drugs are morphine and codeine. Both are synthesized from opium for medicinal use. The most commonly used drug for recreational purposes created from opium is heroin. Synthesized drugs created with an opium base for use in pain management are fentanyl, oxycodone, tramadol, pethidine (Demerol), hydrocodone, methadone, and hydromorphone.
New forms of existing pain medications are being created regularly. The newest formulation to come out was in 2014 when zohydro, an increased dosage formula of hydrocodone, was released; this is so far the strongest hydrocodone formulation created for pain management, on par with a moderate dose of oxycodone .

Analgesics
Analgesics are drugs that relieve pain. There are two main types: non-narcotic analgesics for mild pain, and narcotic analgesics for severe pain.

Narcotic analgesics
Narcotic analgesics tend to be opioids. They bind to opioid receptors which are G-Protein coupled receptors distributed in brain, spinal cord, digestive tract, peripheral neurons.

Mechanism
There are three types of opioid receptors: Mu (μ-opioid receptors), delta, and kappa (κ-opioid receptor). Endogenous opioids (enkephalins, dynorphin, endorphin) do not bind specifically to any particular opioid receptor. Receptor binding of the opioid causes a cascade leading to the channel opening and hyperpolarization of the neuron. The opioid receptors have the following channel types: Mu, K+ channel; l Delta, K+ channel; Kappa, Ca2+ channel. Hyperpolarization can lead to post-synaptic neural inhibition and presynaptic inhibition of neurotransmitter release. Post-synaptic neural inhibition can reduce analgesia and central hyperactivity may reduce its efficacy.  
The mechanism of Kappa receptors is slightly different than Mu and Delta, in that Ca2+ channels close instead of K+ channels, and K+ channels open in mu and delta.

See also 

 Commission on Narcotic Drugs
 East African drug trade
 Equianalgesic
 Narcoterrorism
 Narcotics Anonymous
 Opioid
 Prohibition of drugs
 War on drugs

References

External links 

 Pharmer.org—A non-profit site providing detailed descriptions of most narcotic analgesics
 List of controlled substances, some of which are classified as "narcotics", in the U.S. Controlled Substances Act (CSA). Not all of the classified ones are chemically narcotic, as described at the top of this page.

Opioids